Michel Heinrich (born February 15, 1946, in Thann, Haut-Rhin) was a member of the National Assembly of France.  He represented Vosges' 1st constituency from 2002 to 2017, as a member of the Union for a Popular Movement.

References

1946 births
Living people
People from Thann, Haut-Rhin
Union for a Popular Movement politicians
Deputies of the 12th National Assembly of the French Fifth Republic
Deputies of the 13th National Assembly of the French Fifth Republic
Deputies of the 14th National Assembly of the French Fifth Republic